The Heat is the second studio album by American Christian rock band Needtobreathe, released on August 28, 2007 under Atlantic/Word Records. The album reached No. 164 on Billboards Top 200 and No. 2 on the Top Heatseekers charts. The first single from the album, "Signature of Divine (Yahweh)", reached No. 1 on R&R's Christian contemporary hit radio chart, and was the No. 14 most played song in 2007 on the same radio format. "Washed by the Water" was the sixth most-played song on R&R magazine's Christian CHR chart for 2008. The Heat was GMA Dove Award-nominated for "Rock/Contemporary Album of the Year", as well as "Rock/Contemporary Song of the Year" for the song "Signature of Divine (Yahweh)".

Recording
The album was recorded over a six-month period of time, from late 2006 to spring 2007. The band recorded the album at the following studios: Seth Bolts' Plantation Studios in Walhalla, South Carolina, Rick Beato's Black Dog Studio in Stone Mountain, Georgia, Ed Roland's Tree Sound Studios in Atlanta, Georgia and Rax Trax Recordings in Chicago, Illinois.

Release and promotion
In late 2007, MTV used "We Could Run Away" in their TV show The Hills. Also, FOX used the song "Nothing Left to Lose" for promotions of their shows Prison Break and K-Ville.

The song "More Time" is featured in the 2007 film P.S. I Love You and its Atlantic Records soundtrack.

The song "Nothing Left To Lose" was featured in the theatrical trailer for the 2009 film "Extraordinary Measures".

At the 39th annual GMA Dove Awards in 2008, The Heat was nominated for "Rock/Contemporary Album of the Year", and "Signature of Divine (Yahweh)" was nominated for "Rock/Contemporary Song of the Year".

On February 8, 2016,  "Streets of Gold" was used in the video package for the retirement of American professional wrestler, Daniel Bryan.

Critical reception

The Heat garnered generally positive reception by music critics. At AllMusic, Jared Johnson rated the album four stars, and suggested that "now that the cat's out of the bag (i.e. their sound no longer commands an aura of mystery and intrigue), the boys seem to have lost just a touch of their pioneering spirit, [but] that cannot distract from the album's strong, approachable rock that plays best when cranked to a '10.'" Chad Bonham of CCM Magazine rated the album four stars, and indicated that the album "allow[s] its deep-seeded  faith to seep into a much larger portion of its material", and he affirmed that the album "will appeal to any fans of solid pop-driven rock music that features the rare combination of solid musicianship and lyrical genius." At Christian Broadcasting Network, Jennifer E. Jones rated the album four stars, and felt that "Needtobreathe continues to look at life and contemporary Christian music from new and exciting angles."

At Christian Music Review, Jay Heilman rated the album four stars, and evoked that the release "isn't the most blatant with their message, by their music can easily fit in with just about any genre, whether it be Christian or mainstream. I think fans of rock music in both genres will appreciate what these guys bring to the table and The Heat is a good way to introduce new listeners to what these guys are all about.  If you like groups like Dave Matthews Band or perhaps Kings of Leon, I think Needtobreathe would complement your listening experience.  Check them out." Founder Tony Cummings of Cross Rhythms rated the album nine squares out of ten, and stated that the release has "the tracks here represent a varied musical feast brim full of lyrical and musical intelligence." At Christianity Today, Christa Banister rated the album four stars, and affirmed that the band have the "ability to communicate these simple truths with creative panache that makes The Heat such a winning effort."

At Jesus Freak Hideout, John DiBiase rated the album four-and-a-half stars, and underscored that the album "offers a little bit of everything". Horacio García Oliveros of Melodic.net rated the album four-and-a-half stars, and hinted at the album being "very introspective and spiritual album, treating subjects like having hope in the darkest moments, relationships, love, and –of course- God", which he noted this album "sounds a lot like Maroon 5, but much better." Lastly, García Oliveros ended "to summarize, do yourself a favor and listen to his album. You won't regret it." Tom Spinelli of Melodic.net rated the album three stars, and criticized the album by stating that "the only negative thing I have for this album is the singer doesn't really do much with his voice making some of the tracks seem repetitive", but he concluded by saying "other than that these songs are really good and these guys know how to write a catchy Christian rock ballad. For fans of Splender, Sanctus Real, Mainstay." At The Phantom Tollbooth, Brian A. Smith rated the album three-and-a-half stars, and called it "another solid effort" that still won't allow the band to extricate themselves "from the frat rock crowd."

Accolades

In 2008, the album was nominated for a Dove Award for Rock/Contemporary Album of the Year at the 39th GMA Dove Awards. The song "Signature of Divine (Yahweh)" was also nominated for Rock/Contemporary Recorded Song of the Year.

Track listing

 Personnel 
Adapted from AllMusic.Needtobreathe Bear Rinehart – vocals, acoustic piano, organ, guitars, harmonica
 Bo Rinehart – synthesizers, guitars, backing vocals
 Seth Bolt – programming, bass, backing vocals
 Joe Stillwell – drums, percussion, backing vocalsAdditional musicians Anthony J. Resta – Akai MPC3000 programming (2) analog synthesizers (3, 5, 6), atmospheric guitars (3, 5, 6)
 Will Hunt – programming (2, 10)
 Aaron Bowen – electric piano (10), organ (13)
 Jim Gailloreto – saxophone (12)
 Tom Garling – trombone (12)
 Terry Connell – trumpet (12) 
 Set Free Christian Fellowship Choir – choir (11, 13)
 Mark Ward – choir director (11, 13)Production'
 Needtobreathe – producers
 Rick Beato – producer (2, 3, 7-10, 13), engineer (2, 3, 7-10, 13)
 Ed Roland – producer (6, 11)
 Seth Bolt – engineer 
 Ken "Grand" Laynon – engineer (2, 3, 7-10, 13)
 Shawn Grove – engineer (6, 11)
 Rick Barnes – engineer (12)
 Richard Chycki – mixing at Mixland Music & DVD (Wasaga Beach, Canada)
 Andy VanDette – mastering at Masterdisk (New York City, New York)
 Andrew Karp – A&R 
 Kim Stephens – A&R
 Lesley Melincoff – A&R administration 
 Anthony Delia – product manager 
 Bo Rinehart – design 
 John Regan – design 
 Jeremy Cowart – cover photography 
 Dan Rankin – inside photography 
 Kip Krones – management

Singles
"Signature of Divine"
"More Time"
"Washed by the Water"
"Streets of Gold"

Music videos

References

2007 albums
Needtobreathe albums
Atlantic Records albums
Word Records albums